The East Honiara by-election, 2008 was a by-election for the East Honiara constituency in the National Parliament of Solomon Islands. East Honiara is by far the most heavily populated constituency in Solomon Islands, with an electorate of over 30,000.

The election was precipitated by the arrest, conviction for fraud and jailing of sitting MP Charles Dausabea, who had held the seat since the 2006 general election.

A total of twenty-six candidates stood in the by-election. Among them was a former MP, Alfred Sasako. The election was held on September 25, 2008, in thirty-nine polling stations. The Solomon Times reported that many voters and other residents stayed "around to watch the whole day", viewing the election as "entertainment". The newspaper also reported that the election was "filled with drama, with candidates and supporters accusing certain camps of corrupt dealings".

Results
The following candidates finished first, second and third, respectively. Silas Milikada -described by the Solomon Times as a "private businessman"- was duly elected MP for East Honiara. Dr. George Manimu contested the result, claiming "corrupt dealings and voting irregularities", unsuccessfully.

See also
 List of Solomon Islands by-elections

References

2008
2008 in the Solomon Islands
Solomon Islands